The Newport 27-1 is an American sailboat that was designed by the Canadian design firm C&C Design as a cruiser-racer and first built in 1970.

Production
The design was built by Capital Yachts in Harbor City, California, United States, starting in 1970, but it is now out of production.

Design
The Newport 27-1 is a recreational keelboat, built predominantly of fiberglass, with wood trim. It has a masthead sloop rig, a raked stem, a plumb transom, an internally mounted spade-type rudder controlled by a tiller and a fixed swept fin keel. It displaces  and carries  of lead ballast.

The boat is optionally fitted with a Universal Atomic 4 gasoline engine for docking and maneuvering.

The design has sleeping accommodation for five people, with a double "V"-berth in the bow cabin, a straight settee and a drop-down dinette table that converts to a double berth in the main cabin. The galley is located on both sides of the companionway ladder and has a two-burner stove to starboard and a sink and ice box to port. The head is located just aft of the bow cabin on the port side.

Operational history
In a 2010 Cruising World review Micheal Robertson wrote, "construction is typical for the era and the price point. The hull is hand laid, and the keel is lead. All through-hulls are bronze, but they're fitted with PVC gate valves. Dry storage seems endless, but tankage is inadequate for longer than a weekend cruise; the holding tank is only 6 gallons. Tiller steering is standard, and the underbody features a fin keel and a balanced spade rudder."

See also
List of sailing boat types

References

Keelboats
1970s sailboat type designs
Sailing yachts
Sailboat type designs by C&C Design
Sailboat types built by Capital Yachts